Owen Jennings is a former New Zealand politician. He was a Member of Parliament from 1996 to 2002, representing the ACT New Zealand party.

Early years
Before entering politics, Jennings was a farmer. Jennings was active in New Zealand Federated Farmers, becoming its National President in 1990.  He served three years. Prior to this he was National Dairy Section Chairman.  He was a director of the Karamea Dairy Company, Atas Marketing Meat Ltd and Combined Rural Traders Ltd. He also helped start the Queen Elizabeth II National Trust and was a director for nine years. Jennings was active in the Pacific Basin Economic Council and attended a number of trade talks on behalf of farmers.

Member of Parliament

Jennings was a candidate to become the second Leader of ACT after Roger Douglas stepped down, but he lost the race to Douglas' preferred successor, Richard Prebble.

Jennings was first elected to Parliament in the 1996 election, becoming a list MP. During his first term as an MP, he stood in the Taranaki-King Country by-election where he finished second to National Party candidate Shane Ardern.

Jennings was re-elected on the ACT Party list in 1999; however, he was ranked at 12th on the party list in 2002 and was not returned to parliament. During his time as a parliamentarian, Jennings was widely regarded as being on the rural-centric right wing of ACT.

Further reading

Jennings' contribution is a co-authored paper (with Rodger Slater) entitled: "Innovation on-farm."

Jennings' contribution is a paper entitled: "Local government."

Jennings' contribution is a paper entitled: "Our rural future."

References

ACT New Zealand MPs
Living people
New Zealand farmers
New Zealand list MPs
Members of the New Zealand House of Representatives
Unsuccessful candidates in the 2002 New Zealand general election
Year of birth missing (living people)